Ramphoprionidae are a family of polychaete worms known from the Ordovician and Silurian periods (and more?)

References

Polychaetes
Prehistoric protostome families
Ordovician first appearances
Silurian extinctions
Annelid families